Sosthenes José Santos Salles (born 18 November 1987), known as Neto Berola, is a Brazilian footballer who plays for Ituano as a forward.

Club career
Neto Berola was born in Itabuna, Bahia, and after impressing for an amateur side of Buerarema, joined Itabuna's under-20 squad in 2007. He was promoted to the main squad in the following year, appearing regularly but mainly as a substitute.
2 
On 20 April 2009, after scoring 13 goals for the side in that year's Campeonato Baiano, Neto Berola moved to fellow state team Vitória. He made his Série A debut on 4 July, replacing Elkeson in a 1–2 away loss against Flamengo.

Neto Berola scored his first goal in the main category of Brazilian football on 16 August 2009, netting his team's second in a 2–3 loss at Goiás. He finished the campaign with 20 appearances and four goals, as Leão narrowly avoided relegation.

On 25 May 2010 Neto Berola signed a three-year deal with Atlético Mineiro. An undisputed starter for the side, he was sidelined for three months due to a back injury in 2012.

On 31 August 2012 Neto Berola renewed with Atlético, signing until the end of 2016. On 23 June 2014 he was loaned to Al Wasl, but returned to Brazil on 2 March of the following year after rescinding his contract early.

On 19 May 2015 Neto Berola was loaned to Santos. On 21 July of the following year, after his loan spell at Santos expired, he moved to Coritiba after rescinding his contract with Galo. On 1 January 2019 Neto Berola signed for Série B side America Mineiro on a one year deal.

Career statistics

Honours
Vitória
Campeonato Baiano: 2010

Atlético Mineiro
Campeonato Mineiro: 2012, 2013
Copa Libertadores: 2013

Santos
Campeonato Paulista: 2016

References

External links

1987 births
Living people
Sportspeople from Bahia
Brazilian footballers
Campeonato Brasileiro Série A players
Campeonato Brasileiro Série B players
Campeonato Brasileiro Série C players
Esporte Clube Vitória players
Clube Atlético Mineiro players
Santos FC players
Al-Wasl F.C. players
Coritiba Foot Ball Club players
C.D. Veracruz footballers
América Futebol Clube (MG) players
Centro Sportivo Alagoano players
Brazilian expatriate footballers
Brazilian expatriate sportspeople in the United Arab Emirates
Expatriate footballers in the United Arab Emirates
Expatriate footballers in Mexico
UAE Pro League players
Association football forwards